Yelavi Dam, is an earthfill dam on local river near Jat, Sangli district in the state of Maharashtra in India.

Specifications

Purpose
 Irrigation

See also
 Dams in Maharashtra
 List of reservoirs and dams in India

References

Dams in Sangli district
Dams completed in 1982
1982 establishments in Maharashtra